Gandalf Airlines was a regional airline based at Orio al Serio Airport near Milan, Italy, which was operational from 1998 to 2004.

The airline operated a fleet of Dornier 328 aircraft in both jet and turboprop versions to a number of European destinations: Barcelona, Bari, Brescia, Brussels, Catania, Florence, Madrid, Milan, Paris (Charles de Gaulle), Paris (Orly), Pisa, Rome, Stuttgart, Trieste and Verona. Gandalf also had an agreement with Air France to feed the French carrier's international flights at de Gaulle.

By November 2003, Gandalf Airlines had cut most of its routes due to financial difficulties. In February 2004 it filed for bankruptcy and suspended all operations. In April 2004 it was reported that Alitalia had acquired the bankrupt airline to gain additional slots at several European airports, mainly in Milan-Linate and Paris (Charles De Gaulle).

Fleet

See also
 List of defunct airlines of Italy

References

Italian companies established in 1998
2004 disestablishments in Italy
Defunct airlines of Italy
Airlines established in 1998
Airlines disestablished in 2004